KNL may refer to:

 Kazakh National League
 Kensal Green station, London, National Rail station code
 Knights Landing (microarchitecture), an Intel Xeon Phi microarchitecture
 Korea National League
 Textile and Knitting Workers' Union, a former trade union in Finland

See also
 Knights Landing, California, US